David Chauner (born August 4, 1948) is an American former cyclist. He competed at the 1968 Summer Olympics and the 1972 Summer Olympics.

References

External links
 

1948 births
Living people
American male cyclists
Olympic cyclists of the United States
Cyclists at the 1968 Summer Olympics
Cyclists at the 1972 Summer Olympics
Sportspeople from San Francisco
American track cyclists
Pan American Games medalists in cycling
Medalists at the 1971 Pan American Games
Pan American Games bronze medalists for the United States